Enrik Ostrc (born 21 June 2002) is a Slovenian footballer who plays as a midfielder for Belgian club Lommel, on loan from French club Troyes.

Club career
Ostrc made his fully professional debut for Olimpija Ljubljana in the Slovenian PrvaLiga on 6 June 2020 against Tabor Sežana. During the match, which Olimpija won 3–0, he scored the team's second goal and became the club's youngest-ever debutant scorer.

On 31 January 2021, Ostrc joined French side Troyes for a reported fee of around €600,000. He was immediately loaned back to Olimpija.

Personal life
Ostrc is a native of Kozina, a small settlement near the Italian border. He is a relative of Milan Osterc, a former Slovenian international footballer. Ostrc explained that his last name, which is written as "Ostrc" instead of "Osterc", was entered incorrectly into the computer and that the error was never corrected.

Career statistics

Club

Honours
Olimpija Ljubljana
Slovenian Cup: 2020–21

References

External links
Enrik Ostrc at NZS 

2002 births
Living people
Slovenian footballers
Slovenia youth international footballers
Slovenia under-21 international footballers
Slovenian expatriate footballers
Association football midfielders
Slovenian PrvaLiga players
Challenger Pro League players
NK Olimpija Ljubljana (2005) players
ES Troyes AC players
Lommel S.K. players
Slovenian expatriate sportspeople in France
Expatriate footballers in France
Slovenian expatriate sportspeople in Belgium
Expatriate footballers in Belgium